Miller Bridge may refer to:

Miller Creek Bridge; Batesville, Arkansas
Miller Bridge (Winterset, Iowa)
Longdon L. Miller Covered Bridge; West Finley, Pennsylvania